Dave Tamburrino (born September 19, 1972) is an American speed skater. He competed at the 1994 Winter Olympics and the 1998 Winter Olympics.

References

External links
 

1972 births
Living people
American male speed skaters
Olympic speed skaters of the United States
Speed skaters at the 1994 Winter Olympics
Speed skaters at the 1998 Winter Olympics
Sportspeople from Saratoga Springs, New York